The Whistleblower is an Indian Hindi-language thriller web series on SonyLIV, directed by Manoj Pillai and produced by Indranil Chakraborty, Anujeet Ghatak, Priyesh Kaushik, Kartik R. Iyer, and Rohit Phale. Based on M.P Vyapam scam.

The web series is available in multiple languages - including Hindi, Tamil, Telugu, and Malayalam - on the SonyLIV app, and was released on 16 December, exclusively on SonyLIV. It consisted of nine episodes.

Synopsis
The Whistleblower revolves around Sanket, a spoilt but brilliant intern doctor, who gets tempted to become a part of a massive education racket that has been running for years. The situation, however, backfires after Sanket loses his father, and his fiance leaves him upon uncovering the truth. In a desperate attempt to identify his father's murderer, Sanket becomes a whistleblower to dig out the dark realities of the deep rot, which he once was a part of.

Cast
 Ritwik Bhowmik as Dr. Sanket Bhadoria
 Ravi Kishan as Jairaj Jatav 
 Ankitta Sharma as Dr. Pragya Agnihotri
 Ashish Verma as Anoop Singh 
 Ridhi Khakhar as Prachi Agnihotri
 Sachin Khedekar as Dr. Ashwin Bhadoria 
 Hemant Kher as Sunil Verma 
 Sonali Kulkarni as Zainab Parkar 
 Zakhir Hussain as Shashikant 
 Bhagwan Tiwari as Roopesh Singh

Season

Episodes

Reception

As per The Indian Express, Ritwik plays Sanket with shrewd crookedness. Director Ritesh's greatest accomplishment here is taking the audience inside the mind of Sanket through a voiceover that explains how he perceives every situation. Ravi Kishan channels a corrupt, deceitful and uncompassionate politician with utmost dedication.

LatestLY gave The Whistleblower a rating of 3 stars while lauding all its performances and storyline. As per them, the writers have done an excellent job, especially with Sanket's character. They believe that the callous, defiant, and remorseless manner, in which his character has been drafted, makes The Whistleblower very fine.

References

External links
 
 Official Website

Indian drama television series
Hindi-language television shows
Indian thriller television series